Allegheny High School is a former high school located in Pittsburgh, Pennsylvania and listed on the National Register of Historic Places.

Allegheny High School may also refer to:

 East Allegheny High School, North Versailles, Pennsylvania
 North Allegheny Intermediate High School, McCandless, Pennsylvania
 North Allegheny Senior High School, Wexford, Pennsylvania
 South Allegheny Middle/Senior High School, McKeesport, Pennsylvania
 West Allegheny Senior High School, North Fayette Township, Pennsylvania

See also
 Alleghany High School (disambiguation)
 Allegany High School
 Allegheny College